Sparganothis matsudai is a species of moth of the family Tortricidae. It is found on the island of Honshu in Japan.

The wingspan is 14–21 mm.

References

Moths described in 1975
Sparganothis
Moths of Japan